This was the first edition of the tournament.

Iga Świątek won the title, defeating Katarina Zavatska in the final, 6–2, 6–2.

Seeds

Draw

Finals

Top half

Bottom half

References
Main Draw

NEK Ladies Open - Singles